Inskip is an English surname, originally given to people from Inskip, Lancashire. Notable people with the surname include:
James Inskip (1868–1949), Anglican bishop
John Swanel Inskip (1816–1884), American minister
Thomas Inskip (1876–1947), British politician
Tim Inskip (1885–1971), British Indian Army major-general and cricketer
William Inskip (1852–1899), English trade unionist

References

English-language surnames
English toponymic surnames